Hot Summer Dance is a live album by American pianist, composer and bandleader Duke Ellington recorded at Mather Air Force Base in California and first released as a CD on Bob Thiele's Red Baron label in 1983.

Reception

The Allmusic review by Scott Yanow stated, "There have been so many releases of live concert performances by Duke Ellington's orchestra that it is easy to become blase about them. ...  Hot Summer Dance features the 1960 Duke Ellington Orchestra performing their usual repertoire from that era ... It may not be essential, but Ellington collectors will enjoy this".

Track listing
All compositions by Duke Ellington except where noted
 "Take the "A" Train" (Billy Strayhorn) – 5:05
 "Paris Blues" − 5:42
 "The Nutcracker Suite: Overture" (Pyotr Ilyich Tchaikovsky) − 3:35
 "Tenderly" (Walter Gross, Jack Lawrence) − 3:35
 "Such Sweet Thunder" (Ellington, Strayhorn) − 3:17
 "Medley: Black and Tan Fantasy/Creole Love Call/The Mooche" (Ellington, Bubber Miley/Ellington/Ellington, Irving Mills) − 7:42
 "Satin Doll"  (Ellington, Strayhorn, Johnny Mercer) − 4:30
 "All of Me" (Gerald Marks, Seymour Simons) − 2:36
 "Jeep's Blues" (Ellington, Johnny Hodges) − 3:35
 "Laura" (David Raksin, Mercer) − 3:42
 "Dance of the Floreadores (Waltz of the Flowers)" (Tchaikovsky) − 4:50
 "I Got It Bad (And That Ain't Good)" (Ellington, Paul Francis Webster) − 3:38
 "Just Squeeze Me (But Don't Tease Me)" (Ellington, Lee Gaines) − 1:28
 "It Don't Mean a Thing (If It Ain't Got That Swing)" (Ellington, Mills) − 1:52
 "Pretty and the Wolf" (Ellington, Jimmy Hamilton) − 2:43
 Diminuendo and Crescendo in Blue" − 9:29

Personnel
Duke Ellington – piano 
Willie Cook, Fats Ford, Ed Mullens, Ray Nance – trumpet
Lawrence Brown, Booty Wood, Britt Woodman – trombone 
Jimmy Hamilton – clarinet, tenor saxophone
Johnny Hodges – alto saxophone 
Russell Procope – alto saxophone, clarinet
Paul Gonsalves – tenor saxophone
Harry Carney – baritone saxophone
Aaron Bell – bass 
Sam Woodyard – drums

References

1991 live albums
Duke Ellington live albums
Albums produced by Bob Thiele
Red Baron Records albums